The Global Honored Crown (GHC) Tag Team Championship is a professional wrestling tag team title in Japanese promotion Pro Wrestling Noah. It was created on October 19, 2001, when Scorpio & Vader defeated Jun Akiyama & Akitoshi Saito in a tournament final. Though it is typically contested among heavyweights (>), some junior heavyweights such as Naomichi Marufuji and Yoshinari Ogawa have held it in the past. It is currently one of two tag team titles in Noah, along with the GHC Junior Heavyweight Tag Team Championship (reserved for junior heavyweights). 

There have been a total of 63 reigns shared between 50 different teams, consisting of 57 different individual champions. The current champions are Masa Kitamiya and Daiki Inaba who are in their first reign as a team, while it's the seventh individually for Kitamiya and the first for Inaba.

Title history

Combined reigns

By team

By wrestler

See also
GHC Heavyweight Championship
GHC Junior Heavyweight Championship
GHC National Championship
GHC Junior Heavyweight Tag Team Championship

Notes

References

External links
Official title history at Noah.co.jp
Title history at Wrestling-Titles.com

Pro Wrestling Noah championships
Tag team wrestling championships